Mannar Thrikkuratti Mahadeva Temple is an ancient Hindu temple dedicated to Shiva is situated on the banks of the Pampa river at Mannar of Alleppey District in Kerala state in India. The presiding deity of the temple is Shiva, located in main sanctum sanatorium, facing East. According to folklore, sage Parashurama has installed the idol. The temple is a part of the 108 famous Shiva temples in Kerala. It is believed that the mammoth temple compound wall was built by a troupe of Bhootas of Lord Paramasiva in one night. The temple was builted by King Maandhatha of Ishyaku Dynasty (Sooryavamsam).

See also
 108 Shiva Temples
 Temples of Kerala
 Annamanada Thrikkuratti Mahadeva Temple

Gallery

References 

108 Shiva Temples
Shiva temples in Kerala
Hindu temples in Alappuzha district